Jaime Rivera Rodríguez (born 29 May 1949) is a Mexican former swimmer. He competed in two events at the 1968 Summer Olympics.

References

1949 births
Living people
Mexican male swimmers
Olympic swimmers of Mexico
Swimmers at the 1968 Summer Olympics
Sportspeople from Guadalajara, Jalisco